Alan Marshall may refer to:

Alan Marshall (Australian author) (1902–1984), Australian writer
Alan Marshall (cricketer) (1895–1973), India-born English cricketer
Alan Marshall (historian) (born 1949), British historian of printing
Alan Marshall (New Zealand author), New Zealand writer, scholar, and environmentalist
Alan Marshall (producer) (born 1938), English film producer
Alan Marshall, pen name used by American author Donald E. Westlake (1933–2008)
Alan G. Marshall (born 1944), American analytical chemist
Alan Marshal (actor) (1909–1961), stage and film actor
Jock Marshall (Alan John Marshall, 1911–1967), Australian writer and ornithologist

See also
Allan Marshall (1851–1915), New Zealand river captain and river engineer
Allan Marshall (RAF officer), Royal Air Force officer
Alan Marshal (disambiguation)

Marshall (name)